Novokoshkino is a rural locality (a village) in Nytvensky District, Perm Krai, Russia. The population was 6 as of 2017.

Geography 
Novokoshkino is located 50 km north of Nytva (the district's administrative centre) by road. Chleny is the nearest rural locality.

References 

Rural localities in Perm Krai